Ryan John Esson (born 19 March 1980) is a Scottish former professional football goalkeeper. He is currently a goalkeeping coach for Inverness Caledonian Thistle. Esson started his career in 2000, in the Scottish Premier League, as a goalkeeper for Aberdeen. He has also played for Shrewsbury Town and Hereford United.

Career

Aberdeen
Esson started his career with his hometown club Aberdeen in the Scottish Premier League, debuting on 14 May 2000 in the 5–1 win over Kilmarnock. Aberdeen got to the 2000 Scottish Cup Final, and after only three minutes of the match Jim Leighton (playing in his last career game) sustained a serious head injury. Due to teams only being able to name three substitutes at the time, Esson was not on the bench and Robbie Winters was forced to go in goal wearing Esson's jersey. He became Aberdeen's first-choice keeper for 2000–01. After losing his place the following season, he had a brief loan spell at Rotherham United in March to May 2002.

Esson did not play at all in the 2002–2003 season and only twice in 2003–2004, but played the majority of Aberdeen's games in 2004–05. The former Scotland Youth and U21 international was an unused substitute when the senior side played the USA in November 2005.

His contract expired at the end of the 2005–06 season, and after playing in 18 matches during the campaign, he decided to leave the club in order to seek more first team games. His final appearance was against Celtic in May 2006.

Shrewsbury Town
He joined Shrewsbury Town on 30 June 2006 on a free transfer and made his début in the 2006–07 opener against Mansfield Town, which finished 2–2. After playing in Shrewsbury's first six league matches he was dropped in favour of Chris Mackenzie. Whilst playing in a reserve fixture on 18 September 2006, Esson sustained a broken cheekbone, and it was later revealed that he would be sidelined for up to ten weeks. Scott Shearer was signed on loan from Bristol Rovers to cover Esson's injury spell. Upon his recovery, Esson could not dislodge him from the first team, and Shearer played out the rest of the season as first choice goalkeeper. In the League Two play-off final, Shearer was prohibited from playing against his parent club, Bristol Rovers; Chris Mackenzie, who had played more league games that season, was chosen ahead of Esson for the match.

At the end of the 2006–07 season Shearer left Shrewsbury, and the club signed Welsh international Glyn Garner to be their first choice goalkeeper for the 2007–08 season. With a season left on his contract, Esson was told that he may leave should he have the desire and opportunity. However, with no firm offers on the table, Esson opted to see out his contract at the club, and he attempted to win back the first choice goalkeeper's berth.

In 2007–08, Esson was used as Shrewsbury's goalkeeper for the early rounds of the League Cup, where his highlight was an extra-time penalty save as Shrewsbury won 1–0 against Colchester United. With Glyn Garner firmly established as the club's number one goalkeeper, rumours linked Esson with a move back to Scotland. On 30 January 2008, Esson was released by Shrewsbury, after having the final six months of his contract paid off.

Hereford United
On 17 March 2008 he joined Hereford United until the end of the season, as cover for the injured Michael Ingham. He made his one and only appearance for the Bulls on the final day of the season, playing 90 minutes against Grimsby Town. He was released by Hereford on 19 May 2008.

Inverness CT

On 15 July 2008 Esson completed a free transfer to Inverness Caledonian Thistle, signing a two-year contract. He was a regular in the squad which won the First Division championship in 2009–10. Throughout the 2010–11 season he was the first choice 'keeper, ahead of Jonathan Tuffey. He was voted 'Player of the Season' for the 2011–12 campaign. Esson signed a new two-year contract with Inverness in May 2012. In December 2013, Esson signed a further deal with Inverness, which also included a coaching role at the club.

In early 2018, Esson announced that he would be focusing more on his coaching role rather than playing.

In August 2018, he was offered a testimonial game in honor of his ten-year service to the Highland club. The testimonial was initially planned to be played between Inverness CT and an Inverness CT Legends side in April 2020, however, it was postponed to a later date due to the COVID-19 Pandemic which had shut down all football within Scotland, and eventually in December 2020, the plan for the testimonial was scrapped entirely, with a charity auction taking place instead.

Career statistics

Honours
Inverness Caledonian Thistle
Scottish First Division: 2009–10
Scottish Cup : 2014–15

References

External links
 
 Profile at AFC Heritage Trust

1980 births
Living people
Scottish footballers
Scottish Premier League players
Scottish Football League players
Scottish Professional Football League players
English Football League players
Association football goalkeepers
Footballers from Aberdeen
Aberdeen F.C. players
Rotherham United F.C. players
Shrewsbury Town F.C. players
Hereford United F.C. players
Inverness Caledonian Thistle F.C. players
Scotland under-21 international footballers